Charles Hardin Bundrant (January 31, 1942October 17, 2021) was an American billionaire businessman and the co-founder, chairman, and majority owner of Trident Seafoods. At his death, his net worth was estimated at US$1.3 billion.

Early life
Charles Hardin Bundrant was born on January 31, 1942, in Lawrenceburg, Tennessee. He graduated from North High School, Evansville, Indiana, in 1960. He spent a short time at Middle Tennessee State University, before dropping out and moving to Alaska.

Career
Bundrant owned 51% of the privately-held Trident.

Bundrant Stadium at the Evansville, Indiana, North High School campus is named for him.

Personal life
Bundrant was married to Diane Bundrant. They had three children and lived in Seattle. His son, Joe Bundrant, has been CEO of Trident since 2013.
In 2006, Bundrant was diagnosed with Parkinson's disease.

Bundrant died on October 17, 2021, in Edmonds, Washington.

References

1942 births
2021 deaths
American billionaires
American company founders
Businesspeople from Seattle
People from Evansville, Indiana
People with Parkinson's disease